"I've Been Working" is a song written by Northern Irish singer-songwriter Van Morrison appearing on the album His Band and the Street Choir, released in 1970. The song was first an outtake from Morrison's well received album Astral Weeks of 1968. Other versions of "I've Been Working" were recorded for Morrison's next album Moondance, of which, three were released on the 2013 deluxe edition.

Releases and performances
A live performance appeared on Morrison's 1974 live album, It's Too Late to Stop Now.
The song appears on the 1981 video Van Morrison in Ireland recorded in 1979.
"I've Been Working" also appears on the 1994 live album A Night in San Francisco.
Morrison performed the song in April 1973 for the television program Don Kirshner's Rock Concert.

Personnel on original release
Van Morrison – guitar, vocal 
Keith Johnson – trumpet, organ
John Klingberg – bass guitar 
John Platania – guitar
Jack Schroer – alto and baritone saxophones 
Dahaud Shaar (David Shaw) – drums

Cover versions

Bob Seger covered this song on his album Back in '72, and later performed it on his successful live album Live Bullet in 1976.
Bo Diddley's 1974 album, Big Bad Bo had a cover by Diddley of "I've Been Working".
"I've Been Working" was the final track on the 1974 album More Orphan Than Not, by Orphan.
The song was also covered by Guitar Shorty in 2004, on his album Watch Your Back.
Gov't Mule often works the song into its signature song "Mule" during live performances.

Notes

References
Heylin, Clinton (2003). Can You Feel the Silence? Van Morrison: A New Biography,  Chicago Review Press 
Hinton, Brian (2000). Celtic Crossroads: The Art of Van Morrison, Sanctuary, 

Van Morrison songs
1970 songs
Songs written by Van Morrison
Bob Seger songs
Song recordings produced by Van Morrison